Nut often refers to:
 Nut (fruit), fruit composed of a hard shell and a seed, or a collective noun for dry and edible fruits or seeds
 Nut (hardware), fastener used with a bolt

Nut or Nuts may also refer to:

Arts, entertainment, and media

Comics
 Nuts, comic  in the National Lampoon by Gahan Wilson (1970s) 
 Nuts, comic strip in alternative newspapers by M. Wartella (1990s)

Fictional characters
 Nut (Marvel Comics), fictional character evoking the Egyptian sky goddess
 Nut (movie character), character portrayed by Shing Fui-On in two late 20th-century Hong Kong crime films

Films
 Nuts (1987 film), American drama
 Nuts (2012 film), French comedy
 Nuts! (film), animated documentary on John R. Brinkley

Television
 John Acorn, the "nature nut" in series Acorn, The Nature Nut
NBC Universal Television Studio, or NUTS, former name of television  arm of NBCUniversal / Universal Television
 Nuts TV, British television channel related to Nuts magazine

Other uses in arts, entertainment, and media
 Nut, album by KT Tunstall
Nuts (album), by Kevin Gilbert
 Nuts (magazine),  UK men's weekly
 Nuts (play), 1979 play by Tom Topor
 "Nuts", song by Brooke Candy and Lil Aaron

Health
 NUT carcinoma, rare, very aggressive cancer

Institutions and organisations 
 National Union of Teachers or NUT, former British trade union for school teachers
 Norwegian University of Science and Technology or NUT
 NUT (studio), anime studio

Instruments and mechanical tools
 Nut (climbing), metal device for wedging in rock crevices
 Nut, moving element of a ball screw
 Nut (string instrument), device supporting and stabilizing strings near the headstock of a violin or guitar

Science and technology 
 306367 Nut, Apollo asteroid (1960)
 Network UPS Tools or NUTS
 No U-Turn Sampler or NUTS, algorithm
 Nuclear utilization target selection or NUTS, theory regarding nuclear weaponry
 NUT Container, FFmpeg format

Slang
 An insane person 
 Nut hand or "the nuts", poker term for an unbeatable hand
 "Nuts", human testicles
 "Nut", term that can either refer to semen or ejaculation

Other uses
 Nut (goddess), the Egyptian goddess of the sky
 Nut, the En dash in typography
 Modesto Nuts, minor league baseball team in Modesto, California, USA
 No U-turn syndrome or NUTS, term describing Singaporean culture
 NUT Motorcycles, Newcastle-upon-Tyne motorcycle manufacturer
 "Nuts!", U.S. Army General Anthony McAuliffe's refusal-to-surrender message during the World War II German siege of Bastogne
 NUTS, European Union system of multiple layers of geographical divisions known as Nomenclature of Territorial Units for Statistics
 Nutty slack, cheap fuel consisting of slack (coal dust) and small lumps of coal (nuts) (British English)
 The Nut (Tasmania), volcanic plug near the town of Stanley, Australia

See also
 Nutcase (disambiguation)
 Nut grass (disambiguation)
 Nut job (disambiguation)
 Nutcracker (disambiguation)
 Nutt (disambiguation)
 Nutter (disambiguation)
 The Nut (disambiguation)